18 Years Old and Rising is a 2011 French comedy film directed by Frédéric Louf.

The original French title of the film is taken from a 1981 Patrick Coutin hit song called "J'aime regarder les filles".

Plot 
Primo, son of Province florists, struggles paying his rent. He spends his tray for the second time. On the eve of 10 May 1981 he meets Gabrielle and he falls madly in love with her at first sight. Unfortunately they don't take to the same people. Primo then will try anything to get a place in this Parisian bourgeois society that seems so difficult to access. In order to show his passion and love for Gabrielle he doesn't hesitate to take risks, even if that requires him to become illicit and put his life in danger.

Cast 

 Pierre Niney as Primo Bramsi
 Lou de Laâge as Gabrielle
 Audrey Bastien as Delphine
 Ali Marhyar as Malik
 Victor Bessière as Paul
 Michel Vuillermoz as Pierre Bramsi
 Catherine Chevallier as Françoise Bramsi
 Johan Libéreau as Nino Bramsi
  as Marie-Ange Bramsi
 Thomas Chabrol as the math professor
 Hervé Pierre as Delphine's father
 Jean-Baptiste Marcenac as Gabrielle's father
  as Rachid
 Mathieu Lourdel as Olivier
 Marion Chabassol as Sophie
 Yohan Djabour as Jean-Yves

Release
The film was presented at the Cabourg Film Festival (France), the Toronto International Film Festival (Canada), the São Paulo International Film Festival (Brazil) and the Taipei Golden Horse Film Festival (Taiwan).

Accolades

References

External links 
 
 

2011 films
2011 comedy films
2011 directorial debut films
French comedy films
2010s French-language films
2010s French films